is a Japanese anime sound director who was born in Toyama Prefecture. He studied in the economics department at the Toyama University. After graduating, he moved to Tokyo with the aim of becoming a theatre director. He joined Zoukei Theater Company, which was supervised by Ushio Shima, and worked as an assistant director. In November 1966, he joined Tatsunoko Production. After becoming independent, he worked as a contractor for Tohokushinsha Film before founding Arts Pro in September 1974. In 2014, at his own discretion, Arts Pro dissolved and he went freelance. He has been an honorary member of the Japan Audio Producers' Association since June 2014. Currently, he works mainly on productions by Madhouse and Toei Animation.

Notable works

TV animation
Akagi
Battle Athletes Victory
Bubblegum Crisis Tokyo 2040
Claymore
Dragon Drive
Gungrave
Kaiji
Macross 7
Master Keaton
Ninja Scroll: The Series
One Outs
Seven of Seven
Speed Racer
Tenchi in Tokyo
Tenchi Muyo GXP
Tenjho Tenge
Tetsujin 28th
The Super Dimension Fortress Macross
Trigun
Vampire Princess Miyu
X

OVA
Battle Angel
Battle Athletes
Biohunter
Dangaioh
Dragon Half
El Hazard series
Giant Robo
Gin Rei
Here is Greenwood
Macross II
Magical Girl Pretty Sammy
Master Keaton
Megazone 23
Megazone 23 Part II
Megazone 23 Part III
Mezzo DSA
Outlanders
Record of Lodoss War
Street Fighter Alpha: Generations
Tenchi Muyo series
Twilight of the Dark Master
Vampire Princess Miyu

Movies
Project A-ko
Ninja Scroll
Tenchi Muyo series
Tenchi Muyo! in Love
Tenchi Muyo! Daughter of Darkness
Tenchi Forever!
X

External links
 
 Video Techno Academia profile
 Japan Audio Producers' Association interview

1943 births
Living people
People from Toyama Prefecture
Japanese sound designers
Japanese voice directors